Passiflora macrophylla, commonly called the tree passion flower, is one of the relatively few species in Passiflora with a tree-like growth pattern (growing to 10–20 ft). The leaves can grow up to three feet long by one foot wide. Flowers are borne as inflorescences from the trunk as the plant does not often branch. The flowers have white petals and a yellow corona. Rounded fruits follow and may reach  in diameter. It is native to humid and wet lowland regions of Ecuador with one collection reported from Colombia.

References

Species listing on Tropicos

macrophylla